Ascaso could refer to: 
 village of Ascaso in Spain's Province of Huesca
 Ascaso Factory, a Barcelona-based Spanish espresso machine and horeca manufacturer, established in 1961
 Francisco Ascaso, anarcho-syndicalist figure active during the Spanish Civil War